Dice is an American comedy television series created by Scot Armstrong starring Andrew Dice Clay as himself. On March 20, 2015, Showtime ordered a six-episode first season. The series premiered on Showtime on April 10, 2016. On September 22, 2016, Showtime renewed Dice for a seven-episode second season, which premiered on August 20, 2017. On January 30, 2018, it was announced that the series had been canceled after two seasons.

Premise
Dice follows "the stops and starts of Andrew Dice Clay’s career resurgence in his transplanted home base of Las Vegas. Mired in Sin City’s suburbs, Clay tries to live his life while still trapped in the skin of his infamous character. You remember: the adult nursery rhymes, the insults, the ban from MTV, the deliberate controversy. He works to pay back his gambling debts, manage his sons’ heavy metal band and fend off pumped-up fans — all while sporting his trademark black leather jacket and fingerless gloves, poised for a comeback."

Cast and characters

Main

Andrew Dice Clay as himself
Kevin Corrigan as "Milkshake"
Natasha Leggero as Carmen

Recurring

 Brad Morris as Brett
 Cedric Yarbrough as Russell Patterson
 Ron Livingston as Sydney Stein
 Patrick Fischler as Toby
 Chris Williams as Marvin
 David Arquette as himself
 Mary Holland as Trudy
 Andrew Daly as Richard
 Lorraine Bracco as Toni
 Billy Gardell as Frank Rizanski
 James Woods as himself

Guest

 Adrien Brody as himself ("Ego")
 Criss Angel as himself ("Prestige")
 Wayne Newton as himself ("Prestige")
 Rita Rudner as herself ("Prestige")
 Michael Rapaport as Bobby the Mooch ("Six Grand")
 Joe Lo Truglio as Roger ("It's a Miserable Life")
 Laraine Newman as Darcy ("No Bullshit")
 Tony Orlando as himself ("No Bullshit")
 Michael Imperioli as himself ("Fingerless")
 Mickey Rourke as himself ("Fingerless")
 Yakov Smirnoff as himself ("The Trial")

Episodes

Season 1 (2016)

Season 2 (2017)

Production

Broadcast
The pilot was made available on April 1, 2016, through Amazon Prime, Apple TV, YouTube, Hulu, Roku, PlayStation Vue and other streaming platforms and all six episodes were made available on April 10, 2016, via Showtime's streaming services and on-demand.

Reception
The first season of Dice has been met with mixed reviews from critics. On the review aggregation website Rotten Tomatoes, the first season holds a 33% approval rating with an average rating of 5.26 out of 10 based on 15 reviews. The website's critical consensus reads, "The Dice man is back with a few surprisingly funny guest stars, but they're not enough to salvage a series of unfunny storylines." Metacritic, which uses a weighted average, assigned the season a score of 56 out of 100 based on 16 reviews, indicating "mixed or average reviews".

References

External links
 
 

2016 American television series debuts
2017 American television series endings
2010s American single-camera sitcoms
English-language television shows
Showtime (TV network) original programming
Television shows set in Los Angeles
Television series by 20th Century Fox Television
Television series about comedians